The name Douglas County School District may refer to:

Douglas County School District RE-1, Castle Rock, Colorado
Douglas County School District, Douglasville, Georgia
Douglas County School District (Nebraska), Omaha, Nebraska
Douglas County School District (Nevada), Minden, Nevada
North Douglas School District, Drain, Oregon